Dale Ann Bradley is an American bluegrass musician. She is a six-time (2007, 2008, 2009, 2011, 2012, and 2021) Female Bluegrass Vocalist of the Year, a distinction given by the International Bluegrass Music Association. She has released music both as a solo artist and as part of the group New Coon Creek Girls.

Early life

Bradley was born in Bell County, Kentucky. Her father was a coal-mining Baptist minister. She grew up without running water or electricity until she was a senior in high school. She also lived with heavy religious restrictions with her father being a minister. She received her first guitar at the age of 14, making a guitar pick out of a plastic milk carton to play.

As a junior in high school, Bradley met a childhood friend of her mother who was also her new band director at school. He and his wife sang at Pine Mountain State Park, located in Pineville, Kentucky, in the summers and invited Bradley to perform with them. She played with the band (Backporch Grass) and recorded a few singles and had the opportunity to perform in front of live audiences.

Career

Bradley auditioned for the New Coon Creek Girls in 1988 but was unsuccessful. For the next couple of years, she worked as a solo artist before finally joining the group in 1991. She released her first solo album, East Kentucky Morning, in 1997. The album was top ten on both the Bluegrass Unlimited chart and the Gavin Americana chart. In early 2015, Bradley left her record label Compass Records for Pinecastle Records, with whom she recorded her first solo album. In late 2015, her 7th album, Pocket Full of Keys received a Grammy nomination for Best Bluegrass Album  

In 2019, Bradley joined a new bluegrass band known as Sister Sadie and their self-titled debut album received a Grammy Award for Best Bluegrass Album nomination.

Discography

References

Living people
American women country singers
American country singer-songwriters
Bluegrass musicians from Kentucky
Singer-songwriters from Kentucky
Year of birth missing (living people)
Place of birth missing (living people)
Country musicians from Kentucky
21st-century American women singers